The University of London Dragons, formerly known as the University of London Union Purples, are a British student ice hockey team based in London, England.  They compete in three divisions under the British Universities Ice Hockey Association. Dragons are the most successful student ice hockey team in the history of British university ice hockey.

Dragons A have won the Division 1 playoff final (or SuperFinal) in 2008, 2011, 2013, 2015 and 2017 and the Tier 1 Nationals tournament in 2003, 2005, 2008 and 2012. Dragons B have also been performing increasingly better in recent years and the development squad, Dragons C, was the runner-up in the Tier 5 Nationals Tournament of 2018.

Past Club Presidents & Captains 
Club Presidents

Past Captains
A hyphen means that the team didn't play that year. There also were no records of the first two Captains of the Dragons B-team.

Current rosters & management 

Committee 2019-20 

President - Michael D'Aprix
Secretary -Sam Zdatny
Treasurer - Connor Daly

London Dragons A - 2019-20

The rosters are accurate as of December, 2019.

London Dragons B - 2019-20

The rosters are accurate as of December, 2019.

London Dragons C - 2019-20

The rosters are accurate as of December, 2019.

Achievements 
2003 -	National Championships: Rawlinson Plate	Winners
2004 -	National Championships Finalists Finalists
2005 -	National Championships: Rawlinson Plate	Winners
2008 -	BUIHA Division 1: Cup Winners  
2008 -	National Championships: Rawlinson Plate Winners 
2008 -	Tigers Isle of Wight Tournament Silver
2009 - National Championships Finalists 
2010 -	BUIHA Division 1: South Conference Winners
2011 -	BUIHA Division 1: Cup Winners 
2012 -	National Championships: Rawlinson Plate Winners 
2013 -	BUIHA Division 1: Cup Winners 
2013 -	National Championships: Rawlinson Plate Finalists
2015 -	BUIHA Division 1: Cup Winners 
2017 -	BUIHA Division 1: Cup Winners

Retired numbers

Membership Universities 

Students from the following universities can join the club as Full Members:
Birkbeck, University of London
Central School of Speech & Drama
The Courtauld Institute of Art
Goldsmiths, University of London
St George's, University of London
School of Oriental and African Studies
University College London
University of London Institute in Paris
City University London
School of Advanced Study
London School of Economics
Queen Mary University
Royal Academy of Music
Royal Holloway
Royal Veterinary College
Institute of Cancer Research
UCL Institute of Education
King's College London
London Business School
London School of Hygiene and Tropical Medicine

References

External links 
Official website
BUIHA listing

University ice hockey teams in England
Ice hockey clubs established in 2002
2002 establishments in England